Superba, a Latin adjective meaning superb, may refer to:
 SUPERBA TVP process, a process in heatsetting
 Checker Superba, an automobile produced between 1961 and 1963
 a variety of Persicaria bistorta, the common bistort
 Ulmus × hollandica 'Superba', an elm variety
 La Superba, a red giant star

See also 
 Superbus (disambiguation)
 Brooklyn Superbas, baseball team